C. Illies & Co. (Illies GmbH & Co. KG) is an engineering and trading house for the export of investment goods, based in Hamburg, Germany, established in 1859.

The company is privately owned with more than 400 employees in Hamburg/Germany, Japan, China, Korea, Taiwan, United Arab Emirates, Vietnam, India, Indonesia, Russia, Kazakhstan, Uzbekistan and Italy.

Further reading
 Johannes Bähr, Jörg Lesczenski, Katja Schmidtpott: Handel ist Wandel – 150 Jahre C. Illies & Co, München 2013, . (reviews: Japan Markt, H-Net) (German)
 Käthe Molsen: C. Illies & Co., 1859-1959: ein Beitrag zur Geschichte des deutsch-japanischen Handels. Verlag Hanseatischer Merkur, 1959 (German)

External links
Official website

Illies
Companies based in Hamburg